The fifth season of Akademi Fantasia premiered on 17 March 2007 and ran until 19 May 2007. The season was joined by new judges, Fauziah Latiff, Hattan and Fauziah Ahmad Daud, who replaced Adlin Aman Ramlie, while Aznil Nawawi returned as host for his fifth season. On 19 May 2007, Norsyarmilla Jirin from Penang was crowned the winner of the fifth season of Akademi Fantasia, making her the first female winner, defeating runner-up Ebi Kornelis @ Firdaus Yaimal. This season also featured Aizat Amdan, who would subsequently become the overall winner of 2009 and 2012 Anugerah Juara Lagu.

For this season, Akademi Fantasia was held from March to May, unlike the previous four seasons which were held between May to August because the producer did not want the show to clash with Malaysia's 50th Anniversary of Independence Day.

Throughout this season, as much as 6.6 million votes were cast, with 1.9 million votes received in the finale.

Concert summaries

Week 1 
Original Airdate: 17 March 2007

 Bottom two: Adyana Khalid & Ebi Kornelis
 Eliminated: Adyana Khalid
 Quit: Wan Nurul Zhana Wan Mohd Hanizan

Week 2 
Original Airdate: 24 March 2007

 Bottom two: Mohd Syafiq Mohd Ramadzan & Norsyarmilla Jirin
 Eliminated: Mohd Syafiq Mohd Ramadzan
 Special guest: Mr. Yamada @ Abdul Rahsid Abdullah

Week 3 
Original Airdate: 1 April 2007

 Bottom two: Aryanna Najwa Ahmad & Norsyarmilla Jirin
 Eliminated: None

Week 4 
Original Airdate: 7 April 2007

 Bottom three: Mohd. Farha Jasmen, Nonny Nadirah Zainuddin & Nurul Fatin Yahya
 Eliminated: Mohd. Farha Jasmen, Nonny Nadirah Zainuddin & Nurul Fatin Yahya
 Special judge: Prof. Madya Khairil Johari Johar

Week 5 
Original Airdate: 15 April 2007

 Bottom two: Aryanna Najwa Ahmad & Hasfarizal Ayub
 Eliminated: Aryanna Najwa Ahmad
 Special judge: Syafinaz

Week 6 
Original Airdate: 21 April 2007

 Bottom two: Hasfarizal Ayub & Mohd Shawal Ruslan
 Eliminated: Hasfarizal Ayub
 Special judge: Kudsia Kahar

Week 7 
Original Airdate: 28 April 2007

 Bottom two: Mohd Shawal Ruslan & Muhammad Aizat Amdan
 Eliminated: Muhammad Aizat Amdan
 Special judge: Salih Yaacob

Week 8 
Original Airdate: 5 May 2007

 Bottom two: Gadaffi Ismail Sabri & Mohd Shawal Ruslan
 Eliminated: Gadaffi Ismail Sabri
 Special judge: Loloq

Week 9 
Original Airdate: 12 May 2007

 Bottom two: Mohd Shawal Ruslan & Nur Heliza Helmi
 Eliminated: Mohd Shawal Ruslan
 Special judges: Loloq & Siti Nurhaliza

Week 10 
Original Airdate: 19 May 2007

 Fifth: Candra Clement
 Fourth: Nur Heliza Helmi
 Third: Muhammad Nur Aswad Jafar
 Runner-Up: Ebi Kornelis @ Firdaus Yaimal
 Winner: Norsyarmilla Jirin
 Special judge: Mamat Khalid

Students
(ages stated are at time of contest)

Summaries

Voting Result

 The student won the competition
 The student was the runner-up
 The student was the first runner-up
 The students were finalists
 The student(s) won the best performance
 The student won the best performance but was eliminated
 The students did not participate in the concert
 The student was the original eliminee but was saved
 The student was eliminated
 The student quit the competition

 In week 1, Zana quit the competition a day prior to the first concert.
 In week 3, there was no elimination. The accumulated votes were forwarded to the following week.
 Week 4 featured a multiple elimination, the first and only in the history of Akademi Fantasia.
 In week 6, the 'button system' was introduced in the concert to deem which student(s) did the best performance, an Akademi Fantasia first. Multiple students won best performance:
 In week 6, Aizat, Candy and Mila won
 In week 7, Aizat and Candy both won, but despite this, Aizat was eliminated after receiving the lowest votes at the end of the concert.
 In week 8, Aswad, Candy, Heliza and Mila all won.
 In week 9, Ebi, Heliza and Mila all won.
 In the finale, Mila was deemed the best performer in both of her performances.

Cast members

Hosts
 Aznil Nawawi - Weekly Concert & Diaries
 Linda Onn - Special Debate

Professional trainers
 Roslan Aziz - Principal & Music Director
 Shafizawati Sharif - Vocal Technical
 Adnan Abu Hassan - Vocal Presentation
 Linda Jasmine - Choreographer
 Dr. Azahari Othman - Motivator
 Fatimah Abu Bakar - Stage Presentation
 Khairul Najmi - English Language
 Jasmi Rejab - Fashion Stylist

Judges
 Fauziah Latiff
 Hattan
 Fauziah Ahmad Daud

Season statistics
 Total number of students: 16
 Oldest student: Muhammad Nur Aswad Jafar, 27 years old
 Youngest student: Candra Clement, Muhammad Aizat Amdan & Nonny Nadirah Zainuddin, all 18 years old
 Tallest student: Mohd Farha Jasmen, 6'0.4" (184 cm)
 Shortest student: Norsyarmilla Jirin, 4'8.6" (148 cm)
 Heaviest student: Muhammad Aizat Amdan 216 lb (98 kg)
 Lightest student: Norsyarmilla Jirin & Nurul Fatin Yahya, both 89 lb (40 kg)
 Student with the most consecutive best performance: Candra Clement, 3 times
 Students with the most collective best performance: Norsyarmilla Jirin, 4 times
 Top 3's vote mean (excluding finale): Norsyarmilla Jirin - 7.0, Ebi Kornelis - 3.33, Muhammad Nur Aswad Jafar - 3.22
 Top 3's vote median (excluding finale): Norsyarmilla Jirin - 6, Ebi Kornelis - 1, Muhammad Nur Aswad Jafar - 3
 Student with the most consecutive highest votes: Ebi Kornelis, 5 times
 Student with the most collective highest votes: Ebi Kornelis, 5 times
 Student with the most consecutive bottom two appearances: Mohd Shawal Ruslan, 4 times
 Student with the most collective bottom two appearances: Mohd Shawal Ruslan, 4 times
 Students with no bottom two appearances: Candra Clement & Muhammad Nur Aswad Jafar

References

External links
 Official Site of Season 5
 Weekly Concert of Akademi Fantasia

Akademi Fantasia seasons
2007 Malaysian television seasons